RK Kvarner Rijeka (Rukometni Klub Kvarner Rijeka) was a handball club from Rijeka, Croatia, formed in 1963. It was later incorporated into Kvarner Kostrena.

History

RK Kvarner
The club was founded 27 February 1963, as RK Kvarner. The first ever players of Kvarner were: Simeon Kosanović, Zvonko Ugrin, Slobodan Petković, Vladimir Babić, Josip Božić, Jerolim Ostojić, Marijan Lučić, Davor Amančić, Marijan Glavan, Perica Vukičević and Ivan Munitić alongside coach Eduard Domazet. The initiators where: Đuro Blim, Nikola Mikuličić, Eduard Domazet, Mladen Kopajtić, Ivo Kreculj, Branko Komljenović, Petar Grabovac, Petar Orgulić and Rajko Plivečić.

During the first ten year of the club moved up the ranks from Regional leagues to the Yugoslav First League. During their time in the First league Kvarner's coach was Vlado Stenzel who was at the time also the Yugoslavian national team coach. Stenzel's presence saw players like Zdenko Hibšer, Vlado Vukoje, Roberto Sošić and Zdravko Rađenović playing for Kvarner.
These years where the highlight of Kvarner's history as they played in the Yugoslav first league. Kvarner was the first handball club in Rijeka to enter the first league. In 1969 and 1970 Kvarner was the champion of Croatia.

In 1973 Kvarner was relegated to the Second league with most of its players transferring to other clubs. The club bounced back to the First league the following season with mostly young player in the squad. These players where: Ivica Rimanić, Boris Komucki, Jurica Lakić,...

Kvarner dominated Zamet until 1977 when Zamet started to rise thru the ranks of Yugoslav handball.

Kvarner Zamet rivalry
During the 1960s a city rivalry came between RK Kvarner and RK Zamet the city's best handball clubs. Due to a lot of players moving throughout both clubs the rivalry became more serious. After nearly five years of intense matches finally in 1981 Kvarner signed defeat and gave Zamet the title of the best handball club in Rijeka. Kvarner also gave Zamet three of their best players: Boris Škara, Damir Čavlović and Drago Žiljak.

In later years Kvarner was no match for Zamet and they mostly played friendly matches since they weren't in the same league.

Hard times and  financial troubles
During the 1980s Kvarner struggled eventually  being relegated to regional leagues. In 1982 Kvarner was supposed to fuse with club Kozala forming RK Rijeka, but the fusing never happened. This later proved to be a big mistake. At the end of the decade Kvarner lost their dressing room to the basketball team of Kvarner. Not being able to live up to their previous results Kvarner stayed a low level club until the end of the Yugoslavian league.

With little progress made in the Croatian league in 1996 former players of the club came out of retirement, started playing for the club and eventually made it to the second division the 1.B HRL.

Kvarner Kostrena
In 2001 Marko Kosanović took over as president of the club who reinstated the club in the 3. HRL – West after nearly three years of absence. After entering 2. HRL – West the club move to Kostrena where they played in a newly built venue SD Kostrena and changed the club's name to Kvarner Kostrena. With many former players managing the club it survived for ten years playing in the third tier of Croatian handball. In 2011 due to financial problems Kvarner Kostrena dismantled their senior team wanting to focus more on their youth academy.

Two years later in February 2013 Kvarner Kostrena announced the club would be closing

Venue
From the 1960s during the end of the 1980s Kvarner played on the court of Economics high school. For about a decade they used venues around Rijeka such as Dvorana Mladosti and Dvorana Kozala.

In 2003 they moved to Kostrena in newly built venue SD Kostrena (Sportska Dvorana Kostrena).

Seasons

Kvarner Kostrena seasons

Honours

Notable former players

 *  Marijan Glavan
  Simeon Kosanović
  Željko Kosanović
  Perica Vukičević
  Ivan Munitić
  Božidar Peter
  Zdenko Hibšer
  Roberto Sošić
  Vlado Vukoje
  Darko Drobina
  Zdravko Rađenović
  Ratko Gobo
  Boris Komucki
  Jurica Lakić
  Boris Milevoj
  Franko Mileta
  Vjekoslav Mitrović
  Ivica Pezelj
  Marijan Seđak
  Goran Turkalj
  Ivica Rimanić
  Stipe Crnković
  Drago Žiljak
  Tomislav Kruljac
  Marko Kosanović
  Damir Čavlović
  Tomislav Čavlović 
  Dragan Straga
  Dubravko Konjuh
  Darko Srdoč
  Branko Crnković
  Stipe Crnković
  Mićo Bjelovuk
   Alfred Franković
   Branko Milošević
   Duško Milošević
  Robert Živković
  Milan Uzelac
  Adnan Kamberović
  Dalibor Prokopić
  Nikola Kosanović
  Josip Crnić
  Filip Briški
  Antonio Pribanić

Coaches

 1963 – Eduard Domazet 
 1963–1965 – Romeo Frnić 
 1965–1966 – Božidar Peter 
 1966–1967 – Josip Božić 
 1967–1970 – Božidar Peter 
 1970–1973 – Vlado Stenzel 
 1973–1975 – Ivan Munitić 
 1975 – Jurica Lakić 
 1975–1978 – Božidar Peter 
 1978–1979 – Ivan Munitić 
 1979–1980 – Božidar Peter 
 1980–1982 – Marijan Seđak 
 1982–1983 – Ivica Pezelj 
 1983–1988 – Bojan Skomina 
 1988–1989 – Branimir Čutić 
 1989–1992 – Zvonko Ugrin 
 1992–1993 – Duško Milošević 
 1993–1994 – Zdenko Hibšer, Duško Milošević & Marko Kosanović 
 1994–1995 – Marko Kosanović 
 1995–1999 – Josip Božić 
 2001–2002 – Esad Subašić & Damir Čavlović 
 2002 – Esad Subašić 
 2003–2007 – Ivan Munitić 
 2008–2009 – Mladen Prskalo 
 2009–2011 – Drago Žiljak 
 2011–2012 – Ivan Munitić

Presidents

 1963–1965 – Đuro Blim 
 1965 – Nedjeljko Funduk 
 1965 – Igor Štefanović 
 1965–1969 – Ivo Baretić 
 1969–1971 – Nikola Mikuličić 
 1971–1974 – Nikola Samardžija 
 1974–1977 – Ivan Oštarić 
 1977–1979 – Ivan Pilepić 
 1979–1982 – Rade Škorić 
 1982–1986 – Dean Baki 
 1986–1988 – Branko Rumora 
 1988–1990 – Graciano Vorić 
 1990–1992 – Edi Franković 
 1992–1996 – Jurica Vukić 
 1996–2000 – Vladimir Cipović 
 2001–2008 – Marko Kosanović 
 2008–2013 – Nikola Kosanović

References

External links
Petar Orgulić – 50 godina rukometa u Rijeci (2004)

 
Croatian handball clubs
Handball clubs established in 1963
Sport in Rijeka